Desari station, station code DES, is a railway station in the Sonpur railway division of East Central Railway. Desari station is located in Desari block in Vaishali district in the Indian state of Bihar.

Platforms

The two platforms  are interconnected with foot overbridge  (FOB).
Several express and passenger trains stop at this station.

Nearest airports
The nearest airports to Desari station are:
 Gorakhpur Airport, Gorakhpur  
 Gaya Airport 
 Lok Nayak Jayaprakash Airport, Patna 
 Netaji Subhash Chandra Bose International Airport, Kolkata

See also
 Shahpur Patori railway station
Chak Sikandar railway station
Sahadai Buzurg railway station

References

External links
 Desari Station Map
 Official website of the Vaishali district

Railway stations in Vaishali district
Sonpur railway division